Patrick Daly is an Irish Sinn Féin politician who has been a Teachta Dála (TD) for the Kerry constituency since the 2020 general election.

He qualified as a solicitor in 1996, he worked in the United States before moving to Dublin. He returned to Tralee, establishing his own solicitor's practice.

Daly is married to Mary and the father of four children, he is involved with local soccer and GAA clubs as well as the Tralee Parkrun.

He is also a founding member of Tralee Right to Water. He was a member of Kerry County Council for the Tralee local electoral area from 2004 to 2020. Deirdre Ferris was co-opted to Daly's seat on Kerry County Council following his election to the Dáil.

In addition, he is according to his Sinn Féin profile, also a member of the Education and Training Board, Bord Bainistíochta of Gaelcholáiste Chiarraí.

References

External links
Pa Daly's page on the Sinn Féin website

Living people
Year of birth missing (living people)
Local councillors in County Kerry
Members of the 33rd Dáil
Sinn Féin TDs (post-1923)
People from Tralee